Assembly is a 2007 war film written by Liu Heng and directed by Feng Xiaogang. A co-production between China, Hong Kong and South Korea, the film stars Zhang Hanyu, Deng Chao, Yuan Wenkang, Tang Yan, Wang Baoqiang, Liao Fan, Hu Jun, Ren Quan and Li Naiwen. The film, ostensibly portraying an anti-war theme, was first released on 20 December 2007. It won the 2008 Hundred Flowers Awards and the 2009 Golden Rooster Awards for Best Film.

Plot

In 1948, during the Huaihai Campaign of the Chinese Civil War, Captain Gu Zidi leads the 9th Company of the 139th Regiment of the People's Liberation Army (PLA) to capture a town controlled by the Republic of China Armed Forces (CNAF), then known as the National Revolutionary Army (NRA), during which they sustain heavy casualties from intense enemy firepower. Angered by the death of his political commissar, Gu attempts to execute the CNAF soldiers who surrendered. As a result, he is thrown in jail for three days by his superior, Colonel Liu Zeshui. In jail, he befriends Wang Jincun, an enlisted man and former schoolteacher who has been jailed for cowardice. Upon being released, Gu and his 46 surviving men are sent to defend a coal mine on the bank of the Wen River, which is near Tai'an, Shandong. They are ordered not to retreat until they hear a bugle call for assembly. With Liu's permission, Wang, being the most educated man in the company, becomes the 9th Company's new political commissar. Almost immediately after fortifying their position, the 9th Company comes under heavy attack by CNAF forces. Having fended off a wave of enemy infantry and supporting armour and subsequently destroying two enemy tanks, only a handful of PLA soldiers are still alive. At this point, some of the soldiers claim to hear the supposed bugle call in the distance. Gu, who was temporarily deafened by an explosion, is reluctant to believe them and commands that they fight to the death. The entire 9th Company is killed except Gu, who is knocked unconscious by an CNAF tank shell.

PLA forces eventually recapture the area later and find Gu, unconscious and heavily wounded, while wearing an CNAF uniform he stole while trapped behind enemy lines. At a military hospital, Gu tries to explain that he was a captain in the PLA and that, after being knocked unconscious, he awoke, put on the enemy's uniform in order to steal food nearby, and then bombed an enemy fuel depot before falling unconscious again. However, the PLA went through a reorganisation while Gu was in a coma and hardly anyone remembers the existence of the 139th Regiment, whose members nearly all perished, so Gu is unable to confirm the verification of his identity. He is scorned by the other patients in the hospital who regarded him as a deserter. Later, when Communist China enters the Korean War, Gu volunteers to fight there as an enlisted man in the People's Volunteer Army (PVA). During an artillery-spotting mission, in which the team disguised themselves as soldiers of the Republic of Korea Army's 6th Infantry Division, Gu risks his life to save his unit commander, Lieutenant Zhao Erdou, after the latter accidentally steps on an anti-personnel landmine. While Zhao proceeds with his assigned task, Gu, still holding down the landmine, manages to escape but loses his right eye in the ensuing blast. The two of them become close friends. Later, Zhao supports Gu's attempts to have his contributions and those of his former 9th Company recognised.

Gu returns to the Wen River battlefield and tries to locate the mine where the battle was fought. He is disappointed to see that the mine has been re-opened and in operation and that the old entrance has been buried underneath piles of coal. He also encounters Wang's widow and convinces her to marry Zhao. As time passes, Zhao manages to discover the location of the tomb of Colonel Liu Zeshui, the 139th Regiment's commander. Gu visits the tomb and finds that the curator is Liu's assistant and bodyguard, who survived the war but lost one of his arms. The curator confirms that the bugle call was never sounded because the 9th Company was deliberately sacrificed to buy time for the rest of the regiment before fighting the CNAF forces. Gu flies into a rage and fights with the curator but later manages to calm down.

Gu starts camping at the mine and attempts to dig out his men's bodies with a shovel, despite protests from the miners. After a month of digging, a living official from Gu's parent unit is found and verified the deeds of the 139th Regiment, specifically the 9th Company. The PLA sends an official notice to the local government to honour the 9th Company. However, Gu remains inconsolable because he cannot find the remaining bodies. At this point, he experiences a flashback which reveals that, as enemy forces closed in, he and Wang buried the bodies of the others deep inside the mine. While Gu went out to continue fighting, a mortally wounded Wang blew up the entrance to prevent the enemy from capturing the bodies, killing himself in the process.

Years later, the remains of the other soldiers are found during an excavation for an irrigation project. The PLA erects a monument near the site and conducts a military funeral with full honours for the fallen men of the 9th Company. Gu finally finds peace. The ending titles say that Gu died in 1987 at the age of 71. He was abandoned by his parents when he was three months' old due to famine in his hometown and was subsequently found by a shoemaker in a millet field. He was named Gu Zidi, which literally means millet field.

Cast
 Zhang Hanyu as Gu Zidi (谷子地), the commander of the 9th Company.
 Deng Chao as Zhao Erdou (赵二斗), an artillery battalion commander who befriends Gu Zidi.
 Yuan Wenkang as Wang Jincun (王金存), the political commissar in the 9th Company.
 Tang Yan as Sun Guiqin (孙桂琴), Wang Jincun's widow who remarried Zhao Erdou.
 Liao Fan as Jiao Dapeng (焦大鹏), the commander of the 1st Platoon in the 9th Company.
 Wang Baoqiang as Jiang Maocai (姜茂财), a sniper in the 9th Company.
 Hu Jun as Liu Zeshui (刘泽水), the commander of the 139th Regiment.
 Ren Quan as the original political commissar in the 9th Company who was killed at the beginning of the film.
 Li Naiwen as Lü Kuangou (吕宽沟), a soldier in the 9th Company.
 Fu Heng as Luo Guangtian (罗广田), a soldier in the 9th Company.
 Zhao Shaokang as 'Old Hedgehog' Laociwei (老刺猬), a soldier in the 9th Company.
 Hu Ming as Xiaoliangzi (小梁子), the bugler in the 139th Regiment.

Production
The action and effects team from the 2004 Korean war film Taegukgi were employed to work on Assembly. Assembly is also among the first films produced in mainland China to portray the Chinese Civil War in a realistic style. The film is also adapted from the novel Guan Si (A Legal Case), which is based on a real-life account of a veteran army captain upholding his company's honour.

Critical reception
The film was a massive box office success, particularly in mainland China.

Perry Lam gave a mixed review of Assembly in the Hong Kong magazine Muse: "There is a huge discrepancy between the sophistication of the filmmakers in their knowledge and application of state-of-the-art techniques, and the naivety and bad faith they place in the value of unquestioning obedience to authority and sacrifice as the highest manifestation of patriotism."

Kozo, who reviewed the film at the Hong Kong Asian Film Festival 2007, felt that Assembly is a safe commercial movie that does not offend anybody: "In Assembly, war is never really portrayed as a 'cause'. The human element is the main focus here, and the sacrifices made by soldiers are to be honoured because they're people, and not members of one side or the other."

Sequel
Assembly was quickly followed by a sequel, Assembly 2: The Cold Flame (集结号2-烽火), which was directed by Leon Yang (Yang Shupeng). Although it also featured Zhang Hanyu in a leading role, it was actually shot in 2005 and held back by the studio. It was eventually released to capitalise on the success of Assembly. The sequel centres on the relationship between a wounded NRA soldier and an orphaned girl during the Second Sino-Japanese War instead of the Chinese Civil War. It contains very few war scenes and focuses more on the personal drama between the characters.

Awards and nominations

45th Golden Horse Awards
Won: Best Actor (Zhang Hanyu)
Won: Best Adapted Screenplay (Liu Heng)
Nominated: Best Feature Film
Nominated: Best Visual Effects
Nominated: Best Action Choreography
Nominated: Best Sound Effects

2008 Hundred Flowers Awards
Won: Best Film

2009 Golden Rooster Awards
Won: Best Film
Won: Best Film Director
Won: Best Cinematography
Won: Best Original Music Score

11th Pyongyang International Film Festival
Won: Best Picture
Won: Best Director

References

External links

2007 films
2000s Mandarin-language films
Chinese war drama films
Hong Kong war drama films
South Korean war drama films
Films based on Chinese novels
Media Asia films
Films directed by Feng Xiaogang
Anti-war films
Films set in 1948
Films with screenplays by Liu Heng
Huayi Brothers films
Myung Films films
Cinema Service films
2000s political drama films
2000s war drama films
2007 drama films
Chinese Civil War
2000s Hong Kong films
2000s Chinese films
2000s South Korean films